The Marvellous Boy is a play by Australian playwright Louis Nowra, the second part of the Boyce trilogy. It is set in Sydney, particularly in Kings Cross.

It was first performed at the SWB Stables on 13 October 2005 by the Griffin Theatre Company with the following cast:

Luke: Toby Schmitz
Malcolm Boyce, his father: Danny Adcock
Ray: Anthony Phelan
Victor/Bain Cipolla: Bruce Spence
Esther: Susie Lindeman

The production:
Director: David Berthold
Designer: Nicholas Dare
Lighting designer: Matt Marshall

Sources 
Some of the characters have similarities to well-known people in Sydney, such as the Moran family. Esther's plight resembles that of Juanita Nielsen in the 1970s. Ray has suggestions of businessman Abe Saffron and his partner Jim Anderson, who did die of bird flu. In his Introduction to the text, director David Berthold also compares Malcolm to property developer Frank Theeman (p. x) But such similarities are so numerous and diverse that the play is clearly no roman à clef.

References
 Nowra, Louis, The Boyce trilogy, Sydney: Currency Press, 2007. 
 The Blurb website
 State of the Arts review of the play

Plays by Louis Nowra
2005 plays
Plays set in Australia
Sydney in fiction